Arup or ARUP may refer to:

Arup (name)
Arup Group, a multinational professional services firm
Arup Manufacturing Corporation, an aircraft manufacturer
ARUP Laboratories, a national reference laboratory at the University of Utah
Angle-resolved photoemission spectroscopy
Arup Kotha, also known as Bedeni, an unfinished Bengali film directed by Ritwik Ghatak

See also
 Aarup or Årup, the name of several localities in Denmark and Sweden